The office of the Governor of Abia State is an elective position. The governor of Abia State is the chief executive of the state and its executive branch. Eight different people have served as governor of Abia State since the state was created on August 27, 1991. The current governor is Okezie Ikpeazu of the People's Democratic Party, in office since May 29, 2015. He was reelected in 2019.

Qualification
The Constitution of Nigeria requires that an aspiring candidate for the office of Abia State governor must:
be a citizen of Nigeria by birth,
have attained the age of thirty-five years,
be a member of a political party and sponsored by that party,
be educated to at least school certificate level or its equivalent.

See also
List of governors of Abia

References

Politics of Abia State
Government of Abia State